Poison is a 1991 American science fiction drama horror film written and directed by Todd Haynes and starring Edith Meeks, Larry Maxwell, Susan Gayle Norman, Scott Renderer, and James Lyons.

It is composed of three intercut stories that are partially inspired by the novels of Jean Genet. With its gay themes, Poison is considered an early entry in the New Queer Cinema movement. The film had its world premiere at the Sundance Film Festival on January 11, 1991. It was released in a limited release by Zeitgeist Films on April 5, 1991.

Plot
The three intercut stories that comprise Poison are:
 Hero: Seven-year-old Richie shoots his abusive father and then flies away. The story is told in the style of an episode of a tabloid television news magazine.
 Horror: Told in the style of a "psychotropic horror film" of the mid-1960s, Horror is about a scientist who isolates the "elixir of human sexuality" and, after drinking it, is transformed into a hideous murdering leper.
 Homo: The story of a prisoner, John Broom, who finds himself attracted to another prisoner, Jack Bolton, whom he had known and seen humiliated as a youth in a juvenile facility.  It is an adaptation of part of Genet's Miracle of the Rose (1946).

Cast

Release
Poison had its world premiere at the Sundance Film Festival on January 11, 1991. Zeitgeist Films later acquired distribution rights to the film. It was released in a limited release on April 5, 1991.

Reception
The film received generally positive reviews. It currently holds a 79% "fresh" rating on Rotten Tomatoes based on 24 reviews, with a weighted average of 7.4/10. The site's consensus reads, "Claustrophobic and quirky horror, this is a decently dirty debut for director Todd Haynes".

Awards and nominations
 Berlin International Film Festival Teddy Award for Best Feature Film, 1991 (winner)
 Fantasporto Critics' Award, 1992 (winner); International Fantasy Film Award Best Film, 1992 (nominated)
 Independent Spirit Awards Best Director, 1992 (nominated); Best First Feature, 1992 (nominated)
 Locarno International Film Festival Golden Leopard, 1991 (nominated)
 Sitges - Catalan International Film Festival Special Prize of the Jury, 1991, "For keeping the subversive values inherent to any genuine poetry in force"
 Sundance Film Festival Grand Jury Prize - Dramatic, 1991 (winner)

References

Notes

External links
 
 
 
 

1991 films
1991 horror films
1991 drama films
1991 LGBT-related films
1990s science fiction horror films
American independent films
American drama films
American LGBT-related films
American satirical films
American science fiction horror films
1990s English-language films
Films directed by Todd Haynes
Films based on French novels
Sundance Film Festival award winners
LGBT-related horror drama films
Films produced by Christine Vachon
Killer Films films
LGBT-related science fiction horror films
Patricide in fiction
1991 independent films
1990s American films